The Miller ICA at Carnegie Mellon University (also known as the Miller Institute for Contemporary Art or Miller ICA) is the contemporary art gallery of Carnegie Mellon University in Pittsburgh, Pennsylvania.

Description
The Miller ICA supports art experimentation that expands the notions of art and culture, providing a forum for engaged conversations about creativity and innovation. The gallery produces exhibitions, projects, events, and publications with a focus on social issues, and has been supported by the Carnegie Mellon College of Fine Arts.

The gallery is housed in a three-story,  space located in the Purnell Center for the Arts on the university campus at 5000 Forbes Avenue, at the border between the Oakland and Squirrel Hill neighborhoods. Exhibitions are free and open to the public.

History
Originally known as the Miller Gallery, the exhibition space was founded in 2000 by Regina Gouger Miller, who is an artist, educator, businesswoman, arts patron, and alumna of Carnegie Mellon School of Art. Petra Fallaux, director of the existing Hewlett Gallery, inaugurated the space. In 2002, Jenny Strayer was hired as director and served until 2007. Astria Suparak served as director and curator of the gallery from 2008 until 2014. In 2014, the College terminated the position of director/curator and changed the mission of the gallery.

The Miller ICA has exhibited work by Francis Alÿs, Laylah Ali, Janine Antoni, The Art Guys, Bernd and Hilla Becher, Michael Bevilacqua, Tammy Rae Carland, The Center for Land Use Interpretation (CLUI), Center for PostNatural History, Catherine Chalmers, Michael Ray Charles, Mel Chin, Julia Christensen, Minerva Cuevas, Nicole Eisenman, Inka Essenhigh, Karen Finley, Rachel Harrison, Todd Haynes, Arturo Herrera, Miranda July, Justseeds, Tran T. Kim-Trang, Glenn Ligon, Machine Project, Kerry James Marshall, Gordon Matta-Clark, Larry Miller, Allyson Mitchell, Takashi Murakami, Yoshitomo Nara, Shirin Neshat, OMA (Office for Metropolitan Architecture), Open_Sailing, Raqs Media Collective, Philip Ross, Christy Rupp, Trevor Paglen, Ester Partegas, SANAA, David Shrigley, Al Souza, Michelle Stitzlein, subRosa, Stephanie Syjuco, Sarah Sze, Terreform ONE, TermiteTV, Fred Tomaselli, Kara Walker, Olav Westphalen, Gail Wight, Sue Williams, The Yes Men, and many others.

Notable Carnegie Mellon College of Fine Arts alumni that have exhibited at the Miller ICA include Dara Birnbaum, Mel Bochner, Jacob Ciocci (Paper Rad), Peter Coffin (artist), John Currin, Cassandra C. Jones, Joyce Kozloff, Eileen Maxson, Shana Moulton, Rich Pell (Institute for Applied Autonomy, Center for PostNatural History), Blithe Riley, Fereshteh Toosi, Paul Vanouse, and Andy Warhol.

Related links
 The Huffington Post: First Riot Grrrl Exhibition Explores The Lasting Impact Of The Punk Feminist Movement 
 Pittsburgh Post-Gazette: Director of CMU gallery charts challenging course
 Pittsburgh City Paper:The Miller Gallery's internationally renowned new curator, Astria Suparak, debuts her first Pittsburgh show. 
 Rhizome: Interview with Astria Suparak
 "Art and Science Get Intimate", Art Review, Hyperallergic (April 16, 2012)

References

External links
 Miller Gallery at Carnegie Mellon University
 Carnegie Mellon University

Carnegie Mellon University
Museums in Pittsburgh
University museums in Pennsylvania
Contemporary art galleries in the United States
Art museums and galleries in Pennsylvania
Tourist attractions in Pittsburgh
Art museums established in 2000
2000 establishments in Pennsylvania